Madurai Sivakasi Nadar's Pioneer Meenakshi Women's College, is a women's general degree college located in Poovanthi, Sivaganga district, Tamil Nadu. It was established in the year 1999. The college is affiliated with Alagappa University. This college offers different courses in arts, commerce and science.

Departments

Science
Physics
Mathematics
Computer Science

Arts and Commerce
Tamil
English
Commerce

Accreditation
The college is  recognized by the University Grants Commission (UGC).

References

External links

Educational institutions established in 1999
1999 establishments in Tamil Nadu
Colleges affiliated to Alagappa University